Poles in Malta (Maltese: Pollakki f'Malta) are mostly expatriates from Poland living in Malta.

Notable people 

 Leszek Czarnecki (born 1962) – billionaire, engineer, doctor

See also 
 Polish diaspora
 Demographics of Malta
 Immigration to Malta

References 

Ethnic groups in Malta
Polish expatriates
Polish diaspora in Europe